Lita Albuquerque is an American installation, environmental artist, painter and sculptor.
She is a part of the core faculty in the Graduate Fine Art Program at Art Center College of Design.

Early life
Lita Albuquerque was born in Santa Monica, California and raised in Tunisia, North Africa and Paris, France. At the age of eleven she settled with her family in the U.S. 
She graduated with a BFA from University of California, Los Angeles, and studied at the Otis College of Art and Design from 1971 to 1972.

Career
In the 1970s, Albuquerque emerged on the California art scene as part of the Light and Space movement and won acclaim for her epic and poetic ephemeral pigment pieces created for desert sites. She gained national attention in the late 1970s with her ephemeral pigment installations pertaining to mapping, identity and the cosmos, executed in the natural landscape.

In 1980, Albuquerque garnered international acclaim for her installation, The Washington Monument Project, as featured in the International Sculptural Conference. The recognition this work gained, led to awards and commissions at major sites around the world, including the Great Pyramids, where she represented the United States at the International Cairo Biennale with her installation and exhibition Sol Star which won the prestigious Cairo Biennale Prize. In 2006 Albuquerque was awarded a National Science Foundation Grant and lead a team of artists and scientists on a journey to Antarctica where she created  a large scale ephemeral artwork on the continent entitled Stellar Axis: Antarctica. The piece consisted of 99 ultramarine blue spheres, of varying sizes, that were installed on the Ross ice shelf, their positions and sizes correlating to the constellations and specific stars above.

Albuquerque has created numerous site specific installations in the past two decades including works in the South Dakota Badlands, Death Valley and the Mojave desert. Her paintings are a materialization of the ideas about color, light and perception first created in her ephemeral works. Through her use of pure pigments, gold leaf and copper, she engages perceptual and alchemical shifts
	
Completing an ambitious array of public projects over the past decade, Albuquerque has been commissioned to work in locations including: Gannett Publishers, McLean, Virginia; The Evo De Concini Federal Courthouse, Tucson, AZ; Palos Verdes Central Library, CA; Koll/Obayashi Corporation, Los Angeles, CA; Cerritos Public Library, Cerritos, CA; Tochigi Prefecture Health Center, Japan; Saitama Guest Center, Saitama, Tokyo, and the Library at the Tokyo University of Foreign Studies amongst numerous other sites.

Albuquerque, with architect Mitchell De Jarnett, installed Golden State, the largest public art commission in California State government history, a plaza design spanning two city blocks at the center of the Capitol Area East End Complex in Sacramento. Albuquerque completed Celestial Disk, a star map, sculpture and waterfall in collaboration with architect Robert Kramer, which provides the main entrance to the Cathedral of Our Lady of the Angels, Los Angeles. She worked with architect Cesar Pelli on a sculptural floor installation for the New Minneapolis Central Library, and with architect David Martin, has completed a glass pathway, star map and water wall disk for the Wallace Chapel at Chapman University in Orange, CA. 
 
She is the recipient of numerous grants and awards including the Cairo Biennale Prize at the Sixth International Cairo Biennale, and the esteemed Civitella Ranieri Foundation Fellowship in the Visual Arts, Perugia, Italy (2002).

Exhibitions
Numerous solo exhibitions include: a career survey at Santa Monica Museum of Art; Mary Ryan Gallery, N.Y.; Dorothy Goldeen Gallery, Santa Monica; Marianne Deson Gallery, Chicago; Diane Brown Gallery, Washington D.C.; Lerner Heller Gallery, N.Y.; Robin Cronin Gallery, Houston; Akhnaten Galleries, Cairo; and USC Fisher Museum of Art, L.A.

Her museum exhibition history includes Hirshhorn Museum, Washington D.C.; San Francisco Museum of Art; Musée d'Art Moderne, Paris; Asahi Shimbun, Tokyo; Corcoran Gallery of Art, Washington D.C.; National Gallery of Modern Art, New Delhi; Los Angeles County Museum of Art; and Museum of Contemporary Art, L.A.

Collections
Albuquerque's work is included in 
the Archives of American Art at the Smithsonian Institution, 
the Whitney,
the Museum of Contemporary Art, Los Angeles,
the J. Paul Getty Museum, 
the Frederick Weisman Foundation, 
LACMA, 
the Orange County Museum of Art, 
the Laguna Art Museum, and
the Palm Springs Desert Museum.

References

External links 
 Official web site
"Lita Albuquerque, Visual Artist: Artist Studio Visit", Southern California Women's Caucus for Art, September 18, 2004
Bibliography

Artists from Santa Monica, California
Living people
Year of birth missing (living people)
20th-century American women artists
University of California, Los Angeles alumni
Otis College of Art and Design alumni
20th-century American artists
21st-century American women artists